A Impostora (English: The Pretender) is a Portuguese telenovela that was broadcast and produced by TVI. It is directed by Jorge Queiroga and written by António Barreira. The telenovela premiered on September 4, 2016 and ended on November 30, 2017. It was filmed in Portugal and Africa.

Plot

Season 1 
An airplane disappears mysteriously; on board was Verónica, the twin sister of Vitória, the victim of a fraud by a millionaire. Presumed dead, Verónica assumes the identity of her sister and plans to avenge herself on the entrepreneur's family, finding a strong opponent in his wife Diana.

Cast

(†) Deceased actor

Children

References

External links

2016 telenovelas
Portuguese telenovelas
Televisão Independente telenovelas
2016 Portuguese television series debuts
2017 Portuguese television series endings
Portuguese-language telenovelas
Television series about twins